Plymouth City Council is the local authority for the a unitary authority of Plymouth in Devon, England. Until 1 April 1998 it was a non-metropolitan district.

Political control
Since the first election to the council in 1973 following the reforms of the Local Government Act 1972, political control of the council has been held by the following parties:

Non-metropolitan district

Unitary authority

Election summary 
After 2003, the council was elected in thirds. The number of councillors for each party following each election is listed in the table.

Party control

Leadership
The leaders of the council since 1991 have been:

Council elections

Non-metropolitan district elections
1973 Plymouth City Council election
1976 Plymouth City Council election
1979 Plymouth City Council election (New ward boundaries)
1983 Plymouth City Council election
1987 Plymouth City Council election (City boundary changes took place but the number of seats remained the same)
1991 Plymouth City Council election
1995 Plymouth City Council election

Unitary authority elections
1997 Plymouth City Council election
2000 Plymouth City Council election
2003 Plymouth City Council election (New ward boundaries reduced the number of seats by 3)
2004 Plymouth City Council election
2006 Plymouth City Council election
2007 Plymouth City Council election
2008 Plymouth City Council election
2010 Plymouth City Council election
2011 Plymouth City Council election
2012 Plymouth City Council election
2014 Plymouth City Council election
2015 Plymouth City Council election
2016 Plymouth City Council election
2018 Plymouth City Council election
2019 Plymouth City Council election
2021 Plymouth City Council election
2022 Plymouth City Council election

Result maps

Changes between elections

Unitary authority

2003 boundaries 

In September 2017, the three UKIP councillors elected in 2014, Christopher Storer (Ham), John Riley (Honicknowle) and Maddie Bridgeman (Moor View), moved to the Conservatives.

References

External links
Plymouth City Council
By-election results

 
Council elections in Devon
Politics of Plymouth, Devon
Unitary authority elections in England